Candlewood Lake Club is a private residential community and census-designated place (CDP) in the town of Brookfield, Fairfield County, and in the town of New Milford, Litchfield County, in the U.S. state of Connecticut. It is in the northwest corner of Brookfield and the southwest corner of New Milford, on the east shore of Candlewood Lake. It is bordered to the south by Candlewood Shores, to the north by Chimney Point, and to the west by the town of New Fairfield.

The community also consists of a private country club complete with a marina, a 9-hole golf course, a clubhouse, tennis facilities, and recreational fields. There is also a private beach which is accessible to community residents and their guests, including those who are not members of the country club.

Candlewood Lake Club was first listed as a CDP prior to the 2020 census.

References

External links
Candlewood Lake Club official website

Census-designated places in Fairfield County, Connecticut
Census-designated places in Litchfield County, Connecticut
Census-designated places in Connecticut